Fish Point is a locality in Victoria, Australia approximately  from Swan Hill, Victoria.

Fish Point Post Office opened on 7 November 1890 and closed in 1962.

References

Towns in Victoria (Australia)
Rural City of Swan Hill